State Road 314 (NM 314) is a  state highway in the US state of New Mexico, connecting Belen to I-25 by way of the Isleta Pueblo. The entire route is an old alignment of US 85, and the portion north of Los Lunas is also a historic routing of US 66.

Route description
NM 314 begins at an intersection with Interstate 25 Business just north of Belen. From here it proceeds slightly east of north, generally paralleling the route of the BNSF Railway and the Rio Grande. At Los Lunas, it intersects NM 6, where the original alignment of US 66 turns north. NM 314 continues to the Pueblo of Isleta, where it intersects NM 45 and turns to the northeast. After passing the settlement of Isleta and intersecting NM 147, it turns to the north again before coming to its northern terminus at Interstate 25. The roadway continues towards Albuquerque as Isleta Boulevard, though this is no longer state-maintained.

Major intersections

See also

References

314
Transportation in Bernalillo County, New Mexico
Transportation in Valencia County, New Mexico
Transportation in Albuquerque, New Mexico
U.S. Route 66 in New Mexico
U.S. Route 85